The Brazil women's national field hockey team represents Brazil in international women's field hockey competitions.

Tournament history

Pan American Games
2007 – 8th place

Pan American Cup
2017 – 7th place

South American Games
2006 – 4th place
2014 – 4th place
2018 – 4th place
2022 – Qualified

South American Championship
2008 – 4th place
2010 – 4th place
2013 – 4th place
2016 –

Pan American Challenge
2011 – 
2015 – 
2021 – 4th place

Hockey World League
2012–13 – 29th place

FIH Hockey Series
2018–19 – First round

See also
Brazil men's national field hockey team

References

External links
Official website
FIH profile

Field hockey
Americas women's national field hockey teams
National team

The national team was not included in the olympics and world rankings. They are a small team who are slowly improving